The Aphrodite Hills Cyprus Open was a professional golf tournament that was held from 29 October – 1 November 2020 at the Aphrodite Hills Resort, in Paphos, Cyprus.

The tournament, promoted by International Sports Management, was the first of two back-to-back Cyprus based events on the European Tour calendar during the 2020 season. It was the first time that the European Tour had hosted an event in Cyprus.

The event was scheduled to return in November 2022, however in August, it was cancelled.

Winners

Notes

References

External links
Coverage on European Tour official site

Former European Tour events
Golf tournaments in Cyprus